Three regiments of the British Army have been numbered the 85th Regiment of Foot:

85th Regiment of Foot (Royal Volunteers), raised in 1759
85th Regiment of Foot (Westminster Volunteers), raised in 1779
85th Regiment of Foot (Bucks Volunteers), raised in 1793